Zidane Agustini Banjaqui (born 15 December 1998) is a Bissau-Guinean professional footballer who plays as a midfielder for Mafra.

External links

Zidane Banjaqui at playmakerstats.com (English version of zerozero.pt)

1998 births
Living people
Bissau-Guinean footballers
Association football midfielders
S.L. Benfica B players
SC Mirandela players
C.D. Aves players
Casa Pia A.C. players
C.D. Mafra players
Primeira Liga players
Liga Portugal 2 players
Campeonato de Portugal (league) players
Bissau-Guinean expatriate footballers
Expatriate footballers in Portugal
Bissau-Guinean expatriate sportspeople in Portugal